Kezang Wangdi is a Bhutanese international footballer who currently plays for Druk Star. He made his first appearance in their friendly match against Cambodia and also featured in the 2015 SAFF Championship and their second qualifying round matches.

References

Bhutanese footballers
Bhutan international footballers
Living people
Association football forwards
1997 births